East London is an informal major subdivision of London, England.

East London may also refer to:

In areas of London, UK:
 The East End of London, a traditional designation of the area east of the medieval walled City of London
 East (London sub region), a sub region of London defined in the London Plan
 E postcode area, the part of the London post town covering parts of east London and Essex

In transport in London, UK:
 East London (bus company)
 East London line, a former London Underground line now incorporated into the London Overground

In other places:
 East London, South Africa, a city in Eastern Cape, on the southeast coast of South Africa with a population of 267,000

In former electoral districts or constituencies:
 London East, federal electorate in Canada from 1968 to 1997
 London East (European Parliament constituency), British regional constituency from 1979 to 1999

In organisations:
 East London Credit Union, a savings and loans co-operative, based in Walthamstow